Ugyen Tshering Gyatso Bhutia is a Bharatiya Janata Party politician from Sikkim. He has been elected in Sikkim Legislative Assembly election in 2009, 2014 and 2019 from Tumin Lingee constituency as candidate of Sikkim Democratic Front but later he joined Bharatiya Janata Party.

References 

Living people
Bharatiya Janata Party politicians from Sikkim
Sikkim MLAs 2019–2024
Sikkim Democratic Front politicians
Year of birth missing (living people)
People from Gangtok